Banded Bluff is a prominent bluff in Antarctica. It was so named by the Advisory Committee on Antarctic Names because of the alternate bands of snow and rock which mark the steep face of the bluff.

References 

Cliffs of the Ross Dependency
Amundsen Coast